Al Jadid (Arabic: The New) is a quarterly magazine with a special reference to Arabic literature. It has been in circulation since 1993 and is based in Los Angeles, California, USA. The subtitle of the magazine is A review and record of Arab culture and arts.

History and profile
Al Jadid was launched by Elie Chalala, a Lebanese, in 1993 as a bilingual publication featuring articles in Arabic and English. In 1995 it was redesigned as a monthly publication covering Arab culture and arts, and the most of the articles were published in English. In 1996 it was restarted as a quarterly magazine and began to feature articles in English. Its headquarters is in Los Angeles. As of 2002 he was the editor-in-chief of Al Jadid.

References

External links

Al Jadid (2010) volume 16 issue 63

1993 establishments in California
Arabic-language magazines
Literary magazines published in the United States
Magazines established in 1993
Magazines published in Los Angeles
Monthly magazines published in the United States
Quarterly magazines published in the United States
Bilingual magazines